India competed at the 2018 World Athletics U20 Championships in Nairobi, Kenya, from 10 to 15 July 2018.

Medalists

Results 
(q – qualified, NM – no mark, SB – season-best)

Men 

 Track and road events

 Field events

Women 

 Track and road events

 Field events

References 

World Athletics U20 Championships